Juan José Paredes (born November 29, 1984) is a retired Guatemalan professional footballer who played as a goalkeeper.

External links
 

Living people
Association football goalkeepers
Guatemalan footballers
Guatemala international footballers
1983 births
2011 Copa Centroamericana players
2011 CONCACAF Gold Cup players
Comunicaciones F.C. players